Devil in Silk is a 1956 West German drama film directed by Rolf Hansen and starring Lilli Palmer, Curd Jürgens, and Winnie Markus. After leaving his overbearing wife for another woman, a composer is suspected of her murder when she is found dead.

It was shot at the Spandau Studios in Berlin. Location shooting took place at Kampen on the island of Sylt in Schleswig-Holstein.

Plot 
On a train journey, the penniless composer Thomas meets the rich publisher Melanie. The two get married and Melanie gets Thomas a lucrative job in her publishing house. However, the fits of jealousy and his wife's compulsion to control bother Thomas. When he begins an affair with his secretary and demands a divorce from Melanie, she commits suicide and makes it appear as if he killed her.

Cast

References

Bibliography

External links 
 

1956 films
West German films
German drama films
1956 drama films
1950s German-language films
Films directed by Rolf Hansen
Adultery in films
Films about composers
Films based on Austrian novels
Films shot at Spandau Studios
1950s German films
German black-and-white films